Futsal Panthers Köln is a futsal club based in Cologne, Germany, the club was founded in 2005

Palmares 
  WFLV-Liga: 2011
  DFB Futsal-Cup: 2009
  University Champion: 2007, 2011

External links
Official Website
Futsal Panthers Köln auf Facebook

Futsal clubs in Germany
Futsal clubs established in 2005
2005 establishments in Germany